There were two Australian Opens in 1977:

 1977 Australian Open (January) – Men's Singles
 1977 Australian Open (December) – Men's Singles

nl:Australian Open 1977